John Bowman Chapple (November 20, 1899 – April 16, 1989) was a political candidate in Wisconsin.

In 1932, Chapple defeated incumbent John J. Blaine in the Republican primary for the United States Senate. His campaign included the claim that the University of Wisconsin was rife with atheism, communism, and immorality. Chapple lost in the general election to F. Ryan Duffy. He ran for the Senate twice more. In 1934, he finished third behind incumbent Robert M. La Follette Jr. and John M. Callahan. Chapple ran as a "Townsend Republican" in 1938 but lost to Republican Alexander Wiley in the general election.

In 1936, Chapple was a candidate for the Republican primary for Governor of Wisconsin. He lost to Alexander Wiley, who went on to lose to incumbent Philip La Follette in the general election. Chapple's name was put into play in Wisconsin as a  favorite son candidate for the Republican nomination for President of the United States in 1956 after William Knowland withdrew from the race, but ultimately, incumbent Dwight D. Eisenhower retained the nomination and won re-election.

In 1960, Chapple was a write-in candidate for the United States House of Representatives from Wisconsin's 10th congressional district, garnering 4.7% of the vote. He lost to Republican incumbent Alvin E. O'Konski.

References

Wisconsin Republicans
1899 births
1989 deaths